Goldream is a British racehorse trained by Robert Cowell and formerly trained by Luca Cumani. He's won two Group one races, the King's Stand Stakes and the Prix de l'Abbaye de Longchamp, as well as the group 3 Palace House Stakes. He won all of these in 2015.

References

Racehorses bred in the United Kingdom
Racehorses trained in the United Kingdom
Thoroughbred family 1-u